The London Television archive is a London-based television and film video archive.

It consists of thousands of hours of footage relating to London, from stock shots of famous landmarks such as Big Ben, Buckingham Palace and Westminster Abbey, to news stories such as Diana, Princess of Wales' death and state visits to London from dignitaries such as Bill Clinton and Nelson Mandela.

The main collection of the archive comes from the Channel One News Archive, which was active throughout the 1990s. Hence, The London Television Archive is particularly strong in cultural 1990 features such as the Brit Pop explosion, featuring Oasis and Blur and the rise of Girl Power and the Spice Girls.

It also has website that features art inspired by London, and an alternative tours of London page which features the most important London locations of The Beatles, The Rolling Stones, George Orwell and actors such as Alfred Hitchcock, Charlie Chaplin and Elizabeth Taylor.

The archive is predominantly used by film and television production companies, global television news networks, and advertising agencies.

As of late 2020, the archive "clip" sales now appear to be handled by Kinolibrary, (http://kinolibrary.com/ although uncredited to the London Television Archive, or Channel One News.

Collection

Royalty
The Queen
The Duke of Edinburgh
Queen Elizabeth The Queen Mother
The Prince of Wales
The Duchess of Cornwall
Diana, Princess of Wales
The Duke of Cambridge
Prince Harry
The Princess Margaret, Countess of Snowdon
The Princess Royal
The Duke of York
The Earl of Wessex

Politicians
Nelson Mandela
Tony Blair
Margaret Thatcher
Jacques Chirac
George W. Bush
Gordon Brown
Tessa Jowell
Ken Livingstone
Menzies Campbell

Film stars
George Clooney
Tom Cruise
Nicole Kidman
Arnold Schwarzenegger
Uma Thurman
Leonardo DiCaprio
Sylvester Stallone
Antonio Banderas
Teri Hatcher

Music stars
Michael Jackson
Madonna
Sting
George Michael
Björk
Robbie Williams
U2/Bono, Radiohead
R.E.M.
Spice Girls
Blur
Oasis
Van Morrison

Sports stars
David Beckham
Joe Calzaghe
Michael Schumacher
Tiger Woods
Andre Agassi
Tim Henman
George Best

Film archives in the United Kingdom
Television archives in the United Kingdom
Archives in London